See Saint Victoria (disambiguation) for other saints with this name.

Saint Victoria (died 304 AD) is venerated as a martyr and saint by the Catholic Church. Her legend states that she was of the North African nobility and refused an arranged marriage (a story told also of another Saint Victoria). On her wedding day, she leaped from a window in her parents' house.  Arrested for her faith, Victoria argued with the judge at her trial, who was willing to release her. She was executed with forty-five other parishioners.  Names from this group include Thelica, Ampelius, Emeritus, and Rogatian.

A priest named Saturninus was also killed with his children: Saturninus and Felix, readers, Mary, a virgin, and Hilarion, a young child.

Also executed were Dativus and another Felix, who were senators.

References

External links 
Victoria of Albitina

Roman saints from Africa (continent)
304 deaths
4th-century Christian martyrs
4th-century Roman women
4th-century Christian saints
Year of birth unknown
Late Ancient Christian female saints